Jean Manga (born 2 September 1959) is a Cameroonian wrestler. He competed in two events at the 1988 Summer Olympics.

References

1959 births
Living people
Cameroonian male sport wrestlers
Olympic wrestlers of Cameroon
Wrestlers at the 1988 Summer Olympics
Place of birth missing (living people)